The final tournament of the 1964 European Nations' Cup was a single-elimination tournament involving the four teams that qualified from the quarter-finals. There were two rounds of matches: a semi-final stage leading to the final to decide the champions. The final tournament began with the semi-finals on 17 June and ended with the final on 21 June at the Santiago Bernabéu in Madrid. Spain won the tournament with a 2–1 victory over the Soviet Union.

All times Central European Time (UTC+1)

Format
Any game in the final tournament that was undecided by the end of the regular 90 minutes was followed by thirty minutes of extra time (two 15-minute halves). If scores were still level, a coin toss would be used in all matches but the final. If the final finished level after extra time, a replay would take place at a later date to decide the winner.

Teams

Bracket

Semi-finals

Spain vs Hungary

Denmark vs Soviet Union

Third place play-off

Final

References

External links

 1964 European Nations' Cup official history

Knockout stage
Knockout stage
Knockout stage
Knockout stage
Knockout stage
Sports competitions in Madrid
Sports competitions in Barcelona
1960s in Madrid
1964 in Catalonia
1960s in Barcelona